Alfred Moir (14 April 1924—13 November 2010) was an art historian, collector and author of numerous books on baroque art.

Moir (pronounced 'Moi-er') was the son of William Wilmerding Moir and Blanche Kummer. Between 1943 and 1946, he served in the U.S. Army, turning down an officer's commission to retire as Master Sergeant.

In 1948, Moir obtained his bachelor's from Harvard, followed, in 1949, by an M.A. After being granted a Ph.D. by Harvard University in 1953, Moir taught at Newcomb–Tulane College, New Orleans. He joined the University of California, Santa Barbara in 1963, from where he retired emeritus in 1991.

Bibliography

References

1924 births
2010 deaths
Harvard University alumni
University of California, Santa Barbara faculty
American art historians
20th-century American historians
American male non-fiction writers
United States Army personnel of World War II
People from Minneapolis
20th-century American male writers